Momar is an Arabic male given name, or a variant of Muammer. It may refer to:
Momar Bangoura (born 1994), Senegalese footballer
Momar N'Dao (born 1949), Senegalese sprinter
Momar N'Diaye (born 1987), Senegalese professional footballer
Momar Ndoye (born 1992), Senegalese professional footballer
Momar Ndoye (basketball) (born 1995), Senegalese basketball player
Momar Ori (born 1989), Indian cricketer

 It is also the name of genus Momar (planthopper) in the Achilidae

See also

Muammer